Full Scale is the self-titled 2005 album by Australian band Full Scale, featuring re-recorded songs from the EP White Arrows as well as brand new songs. The tracks "Party Political", "Empty Texas", "Here Comes The Weekend", "Smiles", and "Five-Six" are from White Arrows, and "Feel It" is taken from the Black Arrows EP. The rest are new songs.

Track listing 
 "Empty Texas" - 4:07
 "Feel It" - 4:31
 "Smiles" - 3:15
 "Sixteen Today" - 4:01
 "Party Political" - 3:57
 "Rapture" - 2:37
 "The Heimlich Manoeuvre" - 3:36
 "Sickness" - 4:49
 "Manifesto" - 3:14
 "Here Comes the Weekend" - 3:17
 "Download the Destruction" - 4:25
 "Five-Six" - 5:31

References 

2005 albums
Full Scale (band) albums
Columbia Records albums